Cellbound is a 1955 cartoon short featuring Spike and directed by Tex Avery and Michael Lah. The story was by Heck Allen, and Paul Frees voiced all the characters.

Background 
This cartoon and Deputy Droopy were the last two directed by Tex Avery for MGM, before he left to return to Walter Lantz Productions in 1953, where his career in animation began. It was the last 1950s MGM cartoon that was not filmed in CinemaScope. This cartoon and Good Will to Men were the last two to be produced by Fred Quimby before his retirement.

Plot  
Spike plays a prisoner doing 500 years at Sing Song Prison. However, he has come up with an escape plan and starts digging a tunnel under his cell floor using a teaspoon, only temporarily stopping whenever a guard or the warden walks by. 20 years (and 6,500,004,385,632 teaspoons) later, Spike finally digs up through the outside of the prison wall. He returns to his cell to get his disguises but stops all escape activity when the warden comes walking by again. When Spike mentions to the warden it is his 20th anniversary in prison, the warden suddenly remembers it's his wedding anniversary and runs out to get his wife a gift. This prompts Spike to grab his disguises, and run through and out of the tunnel. Finally free, he gets into a train boxcar, where he guts out a television set to hide in it. Seconds later, the TV is hauled onto a truck and taken to Sing Song Prison. As Spike talks about the many places he plans on visiting, he suddenly sees the warden at his desk on the phone and goes into a panic. Turns out that the TV is the anniversary gift for the warden's wife.

After the warden finishes his phone call, he goes over to the TV to check it out using the listings from the newspaper. Spike realizes he must play out everything the warden wants to watch, using his disguises and careful positioning on the TV screen to do it; first is a Western movie, followed by a boxing match. The warden wants to watch horse racing next, but Spike uses a watering can to pour water across the screen and posts a sign: RACES CALLED OFF: RAIN. So the warden decides on a musical program instead, with Spike playing a "one-man band" that he greatly enjoys. After this, the warden turns the TV off, satisfied that his wife will enjoy it. An exhausted Spike, not wanting to go through any more, breaks through the bottom of the set and starts digging through the ground just as the warden picks the TV up and heads home with it. Shortly thereafter, Spike reaches the end of his path, only to end up back inside the same TV set, now in the warden's living room. The warden proceeds to show his wife how well it works, but when he "turns it on", and The Warden said I him today you like this guy he’s crazy. Spike pops up and subsequently goes into a mental breakdown.

Aftermath 
In a ironic twist of fate, the same year when the cartoon was released, Avery began his career in television at Cascade Studios, which Lah introduced him to, doing commercials for Raid and Kool-Aid (which the latter had Bugs Bunny and Cascade had no idea he created him). In 1978, the studio shut down, and Avery began working at Hanna-Barbera a year later, from where he worked until the literal day he died. Two programs he worked on were released posthumously, The Flintstone Comedy Show and The Kwicky Koala Show.

References

External links 

1955 animated films
1955 films
1955 short films
1950s American animated films
1950s animated short films
Films directed by Tex Avery
Metro-Goldwyn-Mayer animated short films
Metro-Goldwyn-Mayer films
Films with screenplays by Henry Wilson Allen
Films produced by Fred Quimby
Films scored by Scott Bradley
Metro-Goldwyn-Mayer cartoon studio short films
1950s English-language films